Noel Carritt (1910–1992) was a British communist activist, teacher, and volunteer for the International Brigades. Noel was born into the famous Carritt family, notable for their Marxist and anti-fascist politics which heavily influenced Noel. As a young man he saved German Jewish activist Liesel Carritt from being deported to Nazi Germany by agreeing to enter into a marriage of convenience.

In 1936 Noel, his wife Liesel, and his brother Anthony, all joined the International Brigades during the Spanish Civil War and took part in battles against fascist forces led by Franco and backed by Hitler and Mussolini. Noel was wounded during the war, and his brother Anthony was killed while serving as an ambulance driver. During the Second World War Noel became an engineer with Fairey Aviation, helping to create military aircraft.

Childhood and background 
Noel was born in Heath Barrows, Boars Hill, into the famous Oxfordshire based Carritt family, notable for the family's large number of Marxist revolutionaries and academics. Noel was born one of seven children, the majority of which  became lifelong anti-fascist and socialist activists.

The Carritt family's home in Boars Hill became famous as a hub for left-wing intellectual debate, attracting a wide number of people including communist trade union leader Abraham Lazarus, multiple Labour Party politicians including Dick Crossman, the novelist Iris Murdoch, and numerous poets including WH Auden and Stephen Spender. The Carritt family were also friends with another family of left-wing activists which lived close to them called the Thompsons, whose famous members included the historian E. P. Thompson and his brother Frank Thompson. The children of both families attended Dragon School together.

Early adult life 
Noel Carritt was born in 1910, he was educated at Dragon School, before attending a school in Sedbergh, Cumbria. 

In 1928 Noel was accepted into the University of Oxford and studied at Oriel College to study Zoology. During this time Noel became a founding member of the October Club, Oxford University's first ever communist society.

During the early 1930s, Noel and the rest of the Carritt family welcomed and financially supported Jewish refugees arriving in Oxford following the rise of Nazi Germany. Noel and some acquaintances of his (W. H. Auden and Julian Murray) agreed to enter into marriage of conveniences to stop Jewish refugees from being forcefully deported back to Nazi Germany.  Noel married a German refugee and communist activist called Liesel, whose father was the former editor of Weimar Germany's main liberal newspaper the Frankfurter Zeitung. Although the marriage began as a method to stop Liesel being deported to Germany, the couple appears to have had an affectionate relationship and bonded through their mutual communist political beliefs. After marriage, Noel and Liesel left Oxford and moved to Sheffield where Noel began working as a teacher.

Spanish Civil War 
In 1936 the Spanish military under the leadership of fascist leader Francisco Franco, and with support from Adolf Hitler and Benito Mussolini, started a war known as the Spanish Civil War (1936–1939) in an attempt to overthrow the Spanish republican government. To help fight Franco, the International Brigades were created to recruit anti-fascist volunteers from across the world to fight against fascism and help defend the Spanish republican government.

In December 1936 Noel left his teaching job without notice to join the International Brigades and caught a train to London. While in Victoria station, Noel wrote a message to his parents written on the back of a cheque that explained his decision to travel to Spain to join the International Brigades.

Noel's wife Liesel and Noel's brother Anthony Carritt, also decided to join the International Brigades, both of whom took part in battles against fascist forces during the war. At some point during the war, Noel would befriend the Clem Beckett, a celebrity famous across Europe for his motorsport stunts.

In February 1937, Noel joined the rest of the British Battalion and fought in the Battle of Jarama, where fascist forces which were far better armed and organised were able to inflict massive casualties upon anti-fascist forces. Of the 500 British volunteers present at the battle, only 160 survived. During the battle he was injured in the hand by shrapnel, before quickly recovering and joining the republican offensive during the Battle of Brunete where his brother Anthony was serving as an ambulance driver. During this time, Noel followed in his brother's footsteps and also became an ambulance driver. During the battle, Noel's vehicle was hit by fascist aircraft towed to a republican medical centre in Escorial. During this time Noel was informed that Anthony had gone missing. Noel spent days searching for his brother, before accepting that Anthony had been killed by fascist forces. Anthony's body was never found.

After the Battle of Brunete, Noel was moved to Huete where British medical volunteers had established themselves in an old monastery. The administrator of these volunteers happened to be a man called Peter Harrisson who had been Noel's friend when they both lived in Boars Hill. Noel was appointed the role of political commissar in addition to his driving duties. Noel used his position as a political commissar to organise 'singsongs' and entertainment for anti-fascist troops. Noel also served briefly as an assistant anaesthetist under a Dr Jolly, but soon found that Noel was not suited for this work.

Return to England 
The longer Noel stayed in Spain following his brother's death, the greater the emotional strain on his parents. To alleviate their worries, Noel applied for leave and in November 1937 he returned to England where he became a trade union organiser for the Trades Union Congress. While visiting a clothing factory in the East End of London, Noel met a seamstress called Florence Simkins who was working as a shop steward for the Tailor and Garment Workers' Union. Noel and his wife Liesel mutually decided to divorce in 1941, before Noel married Florence later that same year. The couple had two children called Sally and Colin.

Second World War 
In 1939 following the outbreak of the Second World War, Noel attempted to join the Royal Navy. However, many anti-fascist veterans of the Spanish Civil War were denied roles in the military by the British government and treated with suspicion, leading to authorities denying Noel's application to join the Royal Navy.

Noel then contributed to the British war effort during WWII, Noel became an engineer with Fairey Aviation, helping to create military aircraft.

Later life, death, and legacy 
After WWII, Noel became the Head of Biology at Dr Challoner's Grammar School in  Amersham, Buckinghamshire. He worked until retiring in 1981.

Noel Carritt died in 1992, passing away in Checkendon, Reading, Berkshire.

Archival evidence concerning Noel Carritt is kept by the Marx Memorial Library.

Noel's son Collin Carritt went onto lead the campaign to create the first ever memorial to the International Brigades ever built in Oxford. The end result of this campaign was the 2017 unveiling of the Oxford Spanish Civil War memorial.

Citations 

1910 births
1992 deaths
People educated at The Dragon School
Oxfordshire
British engineers